The House of Della Torre (Torriani or Thurn) were an Italian noble family who rose to prominence in Lombardy during the 12th–14th centuries, until they held the lordship of Milan before being ousted by the Visconti.

History 
The family originally sprang from the small fortified burgh of Primaluna, in the Valsassina. The first notable member was one Martino, nicknamed Il Gigante ("The Giant"), who fought in the Holy Land during the Crusades. His son Jacopo married Berta Visconti, and was captain of Milan. His nephew Raimondo was bishop of Como in 1262–1273 and Patriarch of Aquileia (1273–1299), while another nephew, Salvino, was podestà of Vercelli.

Jacopo's son, Pagano, became capitano del popolo of Milan in 1240, holding the position until his death in 1247. His brother Martino (III) imposed his personal power over the city, beginning the Torriani lordship, which lasted some 50 years. He died in 1259 and was succeeded by another brother, Filippo. Torriani possessions included Bergamo, Lodi, Novara and Vercelli. The Torriani were staunch members of the Guelph faction in Italy.

Napoleone, son of Pagano, gained power in Milan in 1265, but was defeated by the Visconti in 1277: he died the following year, imprisoned. His brother Francesco was podestà of Brescia, Alessandria, Bergamo, Lodi and Novara, and was killed in the Battle of Desio (1277), against the Visconti. With that victory the Visconti acquired power in Milan. In 1302 they were in turn ousted. Corrado Mosca, who had already been signore between 1277 and 1281, was returned to power, which he held until 1307, when he was succeeded by his son Guido. Having tried to incite the people against the Emperor Henry VII, Guido was forced to flee, and died in 1312.

Florimondo della Torre, son of Corrado Mosca, attempted in vain to regain power in Milan. His son Pagano was bishop of Padua and Patriarch of Aquileia from 1319 to 1332. Another member of the family, Cassono (or Gastone), had been Archbishop of Milan from 1308 to 1316 and patriarch of Aquileia from 1317 to 1318. Paganino, Corrado's youngest son, was podestà of Como and Senator of Rome. Lodovico della Torre was also Patriarch of Aquileia (1359–65).

Salvino della Torre's descendant Eriprando married Eurilla, daughter and heiress of the Count of Valsassina. Made Barons zum Creutz by the Holy Roman Emperor in 1532, the Carinthian branch, called von Thurn und Valsassina, became Imperial counts in 1541, acquiring Bleiburg castle in 1601, still the family seat. In 1552 they obtained the post of hereditary marshal in the County of Gorizia, where their ancestral nobility had been recognized in the person of Valveno della Torre in 1329. A later member of the Torriani, Girolamo, was named Count of Valsassina by Emperor Charles V, and held possessions in Moravia until his death in Venice in 1530. Francesco Torriani was counsellor of Emperor Ferdinand I and  baron of the Holy Roman Empire: he was ambassador to Venice (1558). Carlo Torriani was governor of Trieste in 1666.

Other families took on the name della Torre (or German von Thurn) without being male descendants of the Milan family (like the countess Alexandrine von Taxis in 1650, changing her family name to Thurn und Taxis, or cardinal Carlo Rezzonico, who in 1758 became Pope Clement XIII).

See also 

Maria Antonietta Torriani, Italian writer who published as "Marchesa Colombi"
Giovanni Maria Della Torre (1713–1782), Italian scientist

External links
Della Torre Family website
Della Torre Family of Mendrisio website

References and notes

Further reading
 Carlo Pirovano, Monica Minozio, I Della Torre, ed. Marna, Gorle (BG), 2003.
 Luca Demontis, Raimondo della Torre Patriarca di Aquileia (1273-1299): politico, ecclesiastico, abile comunicatore, ed. dell'Orso, Alessandria, 2009.
Fabrizio Frigerio, voce "Torriani", in: Schweizer Lexikon, Lucerna, Mengis & Ziehr Ed., 1991–1993, vol. VI, pp. 281–282.
Gabriele Medolago e Federico Oriani, Della Torre di Milano. Genealogiche chimere dalla Valsassina alle Fiandre, in Luca Giarelli (a cura di), I Signori delle Alpi. Famiglie e poteri tra le montagne d'Europa, 2015, .

Torre, della
Torre, della